Frank Decker may refer to:
 Frank Decker (baseball)
 Frank Decker (medium)